This is an incomplete list of works by the French modern artist Henri Matisse (31 December 1869 – 3 November 1954). He is admired for his use of color  and his fluid, brilliant and original draughtsmanship.  He was a Master draughtsman, printmaker, and sculptor, but is known primarily as a painter. Matisse is regarded, with Pablo Picasso, as the greatest artist of the 20th century.  Although he was initially labeled as a Fauve (wild beast), by the 1920s, he was increasingly hailed as an upholder of the classical tradition in French painting.

His mastery of the expressive language of color and drawing, displayed in a body of work spanning over a half-century, won him recognition as a leading figure in modern art.

Paintings

Sculptures
Many of Matisse's sculptures were modeled in clay and later cast in bronze, a process which allows for multiple copies to be made. Because of that, many of these works exist in multiple copies and are in the collections of multiple museums.

Works on paper

Notes

References

Bibliography

Antonioz, Michael; Berggruen, Olivier; Böhringer, Hannes; Labrusse, Rémi; et al. (2006) Henri Matisse: Drawing With Scissors: Masterpieces from the Late Years Edited by Olivier Berggruen and Max Hollein, translated from the German edition of 2003 by Paul Aston. New York City: Prestel Verlag. .

 
Lists of works of art
Works by artist